Hellinsia lienigianus is a moth of the family Pterophoridae which inhabits coastal areas, dry pastures and waste ground and is found in Africa, Asia, Australia and Europe. Also known as the mugwort plume it was first described by Philipp Christoph Zeller in 1852.

Description
Adults are on wing in July in Great Britain.

The colour of the larvae vary from green to brown, and have sparse tufts of white hair along each side. They feed on various Asteraceae species, including mugwort (Artemisia vulgaris), sea wormwood (Artemisia maritima), Korean wormwood (Artemisia princeps), florist's daisy (Chrysanthemum morifolium), tansy (Tanacetum vulgare), common cocklebur (Xanthium strumarium), saltmarsh fleabane (Pluchea purpurascens), oxeye daisy (Leucanthemum vulgare) and Aspilia latifolia. They form a silken tent-shaped shelter on a leaf, within which it feeds before moving onto another leaf.

Distribution
Hellinsia lienigianus is found in the Palearctic realm (from Europe to Russia, Korea, China and Japan), India, Southeast Asia, Africa, and Queensland in Australia.

References

External links
 UK Moths
 Australian Lepidoptera

lienigianus
Moths described in 1852
Moths of Australia
Palearctic Lepidoptera
Plume moths of Africa
Plume moths of Asia
Plume moths of Europe
Taxa named by Philipp Christoph Zeller